Muhammad Mansha Ullah Butt is a Pakistani politician who had been a member of the Provincial Assembly of the Punjab from August 2018 till January 2023. Previously, he was a member of the Punjab Assembly from 1990 to 1999 and again from August 2013 to May 2018.

Early life and education
He was born on 30 June 1939 in Sialkot.

He has the degree of Bachelor of Arts.

Political career

He was elected to the Provincial Assembly of the Punjab from Constituency PP-103 (Sialkot) in 1990 Pakistani general election. During his tenure as Member of the Punjab Assembly, he served as Parliamentary Secretary of Punjab for Labour.

He was re-elected to the Provincial Assembly of the Punjab from Constituency PP-103 (Sialkot) as a candidate of Pakistan Muslim League (N) (PML-N) in 1993 Pakistani general election. He received 34,941 votes and defeated a candidate of Pakistan Peoples Party (PPP).

He was re-elected to the Provincial Assembly of the Punjab from Constituency PP-103 (Sialkot) as a candidate of PML-N in 1997 Pakistani general election. He received 36,487 votes and defeated a candidate of PPP. He served as political secretary to the then Chief Minister of Punjab.

He was re-elected to the Provincial Assembly of the Punjab as a candidate of PML-N from Constituency PP-123 (Sialkot-III) in by-polls held in August 2013. In November 2016, he was inducted into the provincial Punjab cabinet of Chief Minister Shehbaz Sharif and was made Provincial Minister of Punjab for Local Government and Community Development.

He was re-elected to Provincial Assembly of the Punjab as a candidate of PML-N from Constituency PP-37 (Sialkot-III) in 2018 Pakistani general election.

References

Living people
Punjab MPAs 2013–2018
1939 births
Pakistan Muslim League (N) MPAs (Punjab)
Punjab MPAs 1990–1993
Punjab MPAs 1993–1996
Punjab MPAs 1997–1999
Punjab MPAs 2018–2023